The 1964 Navy Midshipmen football team represented the United States Naval Academy (USNA) as an independent during the 1964 NCAA University Division football season. The team was led by sixth-year head coach Wayne Hardin.

Schedule

Personnel

References

Navy
Navy Midshipmen football seasons
Navy Midshipmen football